Peppino e la vecchia signora (also known as Peppino e la nobile dama) is a 1954 Italian comedy film directed by Emma Gramatica and Piero Ballerini.

Cast 

Peppino De Filippo: Peppino Zaganella 
Emma Gramatica: Maria Ricciardi 
Maresa Gallo: Bianca 
Eloisa Cianni: Laura Di Robilant 
Leonardo Severini: Joe
Marisa Vernati: lover of Joe
Umberto Sacripante: accomplice of Joe
Camillo Pilotto: the inspector
Nino Marchesini: Commendator Di Robilant
Gianna Pacetti: Miss Di Robilant
Enrico De Mellis: Fausto Di Robilant
Amedeo Trilli:  maresciallo Trifoldi 
Maurizio Arena: "posteggiatore""

References

External links

1950 films
1950 comedy films
Italian comedy films
Films directed by Piero Ballerini
Italian black-and-white films
1950s Italian films